The women's marathon competition at the 1998 Asian Games in Bangkok, Thailand was held on 6 December.

Schedule
All times are Indochina Time (UTC+07:00)

Results
Legend
DSQ — Disqualified

References

External links
Results

Women's marathon
1998
1998 Asian Games
Asian
1998 Asian Games